Strathmoor may refer to one of two sixth class cities in Jefferson County, Kentucky
Strathmoor Village, Kentucky
Strathmoor Manor, Kentucky